Raulerson Hospital is a hospital and health service system based in Okeechobee, Florida. It is owned by Hospital Corporation of America. The hospital system includes the hospital proper and a building more than a block north, at 1930 Highway 441N, that houses a workers' compensation clinic.

Services
Raulerson Hospital contains most of its services within the hospital itself. It has emergency, outpatient services and surgery services, as well as inpatient floors.  The hospital also has a sleep disorders center. At the building at 1930 Highway 441N is the Workers' Compensation Services unit.

Ratings
The Health Grades website provides data on a number of characteristics of this hospital, all available from public sources. It provides data on twelve patient safety indicators. The rating scores possibly are worse than average, average and better than average when hospitals nationwide are compared. Raulerson  received two worse than average scores, six average scores and four better than average scores.

The hospital was also rated for nineteen specialties. Of these one was rated worse than expected, fourteen were rated as expected and four were rated better than expected. Patient satisfaction surveys were also referenced. The number of patients who gave the hospital a rating of nine or ten (ten being the best possible score) were 67% of Raulerson's patients. The national average of patients rating a particular hospital a nine or a ten was 69%. Patient satisfaction surveys also ask  patients whether they would definitely recommend this hospital to others. Of Raulerson's patients, 65% said they would, as compared to a national average of 70% of patients filling out surveys.

References

Hospitals in Florida
Buildings and structures in Okeechobee County, Florida